Norman Ernest Wagner,  (March 29, 1935 – December 10, 2004) was a Canadian archeologist, professor and University president.

Born in Edenwold, Saskatchewan, Wagner received a Bachelor of Arts and Master of Divinities from the University of Saskatchewan in 1958, a Master of Arts in 1960 and PhD in Near Eastern Studies in 1965 from the University of Toronto.

Career 
From 1962 to 1978, Wagner taught Near Eastern Languages, Literature and Archaeology at Wilfrid Laurier University and was Dean of Graduate Studies and Research from 1974 to 1978. He founded the School of Religion and Culture, and the Wilfrid Laurier University Press. Wagner was President of the University of Calgary from 1978 to 1988.

Wagner served on the Board of Directors of Alberta Natural Gas Co. Ltd. from 1988 to 1995 and was chairman, president and chief executive officer from 1991 to 1994. He was on the board of the Organizing Committee for the 1988 Winter Olympics held in Calgary. He was chairman of the Terry Fox Humanitarian Award Program. He died of cancer in 2004.

Honours
 Officer of the Order of Canada, 1988
 Honorary LL.D., Wilfrid Laurier University, 1984
 President Emeritus, The University of Calgary, 1990
 Honorary Patron, The Ecole Biblique et Archeologique Francaise Jerusalem - The Library Project.

Personal life 
Wagner was married to Cathy and had three children: Marj, Richard, and Jan.

References

 

1935 births
2004 deaths
Canadian university and college chief executives
Canadian university and college faculty deans
Officers of the Order of Canada
University of Saskatchewan alumni
University of Toronto alumni
Academic staff of Wilfrid Laurier University